Trichonephila is a genus of orb-weaver spiders that was first described by Friedrich Dahl in 1911, as a subgenus of Nephila. Trichonephila was elevated to the level of genus (new rank) by Kuntner et al. in 2019. The genus Trichonephila belongs to the Araneidae family, also known as the orb weavers. The family Araneidae belongs within the superfamily of Araneoidea, comprising 18 families. Araneidae family members can be identified by looking for three-clawed spiders that have eight eyes spanned across two sets which form a trapezoid shape, on webs with a sticky glue like feeling. The very diverse Araneidae family is most famously known for their elaborate webs they spin, which are webs made of concentric circles with spokes extending out from the center. In few species of the spiders, you can find a zigzag shape going down the center of the web. Identifying the species of these spiders is not easy with the eye alone, it breaks down into phylogenomic variations between their species best observed under a microscope. The genus Trichonephila, like all other spider species in the world, are all predators. Not a single spider exists that is solely a herbivore or a detrivore.

Distribution and habitat

Regions and seasons 

The genus Trichonephila can be found living in Central America, the West Indies, South America, and the southeastern region as well as the gulf states in the United States. This genus of spiders like to make its web where prey is fruitful, often in open wooded areas, between tree branches, shrubs, tall grasses, and around light fixtures.  The two sexes can be found more actively in different parts of the year, with the males being more abundant in the months of July to September, while the females are most abundant late into fall.

Species 

 it contains twelve species and fourteen subspecies, found in Africa, Oceania, Asia, and over all the Americas:
Trichonephila antipodiana (Walckenaer, 1841) – China, Philippines to New Guinea, Solomon Is., Australia (Queensland)
Trichonephila clavata (L. Koch, 1878) – India to Japan, Georgia-USA
Trichonephila c. caerulescens (Ono, 2011) – Japan
Trichonephila clavipes (Linnaeus, 1767) (type) – USA to Argentina. Introduced to São Tomé and Príncipe
Trichonephila c. fasciculata (De Geer, 1778) – USA to Argentina
Trichonephila c. vespucea (Walckenaer, 1841) – Argentina
Trichonephila edulis (Labillardière, 1799) – Australia, New Guinea, New Caledonia, New Zealand
Trichonephila fenestrata (Thorell, 1859) – South Africa
Trichonephila f. fuelleborni (Dahl, 1912) – East Africa
Trichonephila f. venusta (Blackwall, 1865) – West, Central Africa
Trichonephila inaurata (Walckenaer, 1841) – Mauritius, Réunion
Trichonephila i. madagascariensis (Vinson, 1863) – South Africa to Seychelles
Trichonephila komaci (Kuntner & Coddington, 2009) – South Africa, Madagascar
Trichonephila plumipes (Latreille, 1804) – Indonesia, New Guinea, Australia, New Caledonia, Vanuatu, Solomon Is., New Ireland
Trichonephila senegalensis (Walckenaer, 1841) – West Africa to Ethiopia
Trichonephila s. annulata (Thorell, 1859) – Namibia, South Africa
Trichonephila s. bragantina (Brito Capello, 1867) – Central Africa
Trichonephila s. hildebrandti (Dahl, 1912) – Madagascar
Trichonephila s. huebneri (Dahl, 1912) – East Africa
Trichonephila s. keyserlingi (Blackwall, 1865) – Congo, East Africa
Trichonephila s. nyikae (Pocock, 1898) – East Africa
Trichonephila s. schweinfurthi (Simon, 1890) – Yemen
Trichonephila sexpunctata (Giebel, 1867) – Brazil, Paraguay, Argentina
Trichonephila sumptuosa (Gerstäcker, 1873) – East Africa, Yemen (Socotra)
Trichonephila turneri (Blackwall, 1833) – West, Central Africa
Trichonephila t. orientalis (Benoit, 1964) – Central, East Africa

Body

External anatomy 
The Orb Weavers body is composed of two separate regions: Prosoma (anterior end) and Opisthosoma (posterior end). Both regions are responsible for their own functions and are linked together by a narrow stalk called a pedicil. The prosoma of the spider is segmented and protected by the sternum, carapace, and a plate on both the dorsal and ventral side.  The prosoma is the location of the central nervous system, and it oversees nervous integration, movement and food uptake. Also connected are the eyes, chelicerae, maxilla, sternum, fangs and four pairs of legs. Its unsegmented soft counterpart, the opisthosoma, contains the spinnerets while also being held accountable for digestion, circulation, respiration, reproduction, and silk production.

Behavior

Sexual Dimorphism 
When comparing the sizes of genders of the genus Trichonephila, you will find that the female spiders have the size advantage and are the dominant sex. One reason for the size difference amongst the genus is that following their mating sequence, the females will sometimes perform cannibalistic actions towards their mating partner and kill them. Male spiders will fight over a female partner, leaving the dominant spider to successfully mate and potentially be killed by the female afterwards. Over the past few decades, its believed that female spiders have selectively and actively chosen to have a small male counterpart.

Courtship dance 
The courtship dance is a mating dance males enact, attempting to be accepted by the females as a mate. This dance provides multiple functions for the spider rather than just for reproduction. To begin the courtship, a male must find a female’s web and make vibrations to let her know he’s not prey, it is very common for the male to be mistook as prey and eaten alive by the females before or after they mate. The vibrating of the web reduces the risk of aggravating the female.

Environmental adaptations 
The genus Trichonephila must be able to adapt to environmental conditions in order to thrive in their environments. The males being the sex that leave their web and traverse for a female, have more competition when it comes to reproduction, food, and shelter. The trichonephila genus of spiders has a yellow-colored web and this is due to the Xanthurenic acid content in the web, believed to assist the spider in attracting its prey. The genus also has its own adaptation when it comes to heavy rain, unlike its relatives. Spiders will hang off its web from only its fourth pair of legs, which in turn reduces rain impact damage and helps with draining the water off the web. A new recent enemy introduced to the genus that has considerably shrunk the size of the spiders, are pesticides, as spiders have been reported smaller in size when living in areas present.

See also
 List of Araneidae species: N–Z

References

Araneidae
Araneomorphae genera